In Greek mythology, the name Eurythemista  or Eurythemiste  (Ancient Greek: Εὐρυθεμίστη) may refer to:

Eurythemista, a Calydonian princess as the daughter of King Porthaon and Laothoe. She was the sister of Sterope and Stratonice, wife of King Melaneus of Oechalia.
Eurythemista, daughter of the river-god Xanthus, thus can be considered a naiad nymph. She is one of Pelops' and Niobe's possible mothers by Tantalus (other ones being Euryanassa and Dione, daughter of Atlas).
Eurythemista, one of the two maidens that were wooed by Boeotus. He could not choose between the two until he saw a star fall on Eurythemiste's shoulder; he then took her to wife.

Notes

References 
Hesiod, Catalogue of Women from Homeric Hymns, Epic Cycle, Homerica translated by Evelyn-White, H G. Loeb Classical Library Volume 57. London: William Heinemann, 1914. Online version at theio.com
Lucius Mestrius Plutarchus, Morals translated from the Greek by several hands. Corrected and revised by. William W. Goodwin, PH. D. Boston. Little, Brown, and Company. Cambridge. Press Of John Wilson and son. 1874. 5. Online version at the Perseus Digital Library.
.

Princesses in Greek mythology
Queens in Greek mythology
Naiads
Children of Potamoi
Aetolian characters in Greek mythology
Anatolian characters in Greek mythology